Playford City Soccer Club is a soccer club from Elizabeth, South Australia. Playford play in the FFSA State League. Their home ground is at Ramsay Park in Elizabeth, north of Adelaide.

History

The inaugural meeting of the club was on 16 May 1956 in a garage at the rear of a green-grocery store owned by Mr. Britain on Goodman Road, Elizabeth South.

From the 20 people who attended the meeting a committee was elected consisting of President J. Downing, Secretary M. Dootson, Treasurer T. Withinham and committee members Heath, Taylor, Sanderson, Wildash and B and F Varley.

The name of the club was established as Elizabeth United Soccer Club and the first official game was a friendly against an RAF Edinburgh Select team. The game was played on 16 March 1957 at the Judd Road Reserve Elizabeth. The RAF team won the game 5–0.

In 1957 there were two rival clubs, Elizabeth United and the Northern Nomads competing in the SASFA Reserve B Division. This situation persisted into 1958 with the Nomads playing the season in Second division, Elizabeth United being consigned to the shadowy world of the Metropolitan (or third) Division. During 1958 a combination of political pressure and common sense saw the amalgamation of the two clubs and the creation of Elizabeth Town which entered the second division in 1959.

Initially the Northern Nomads were playing their home games at Ridley Reserve East and Elizabeth United were playing at Ridley Reserve West. In 1960 the club moved to its now famous and formidable ground – Ramsay Park, Elizabeth named after Alec Ramsay, the Manager of the SA Housing Trust.

In 1964, when Elizabeth was declared a city, the club renamed itself Elizabeth City. At the end of 1966 the club absorbed the old Enfield Club and gained entry into First Division in 1967.

Relegated in 1969, the club won its first Div. 2 Championship in 1970, repeated the exercise in 1974 and remained in First Division until 1986. Despite a brief revival in 1991 Elizabeth remained in Second Division until 1997 when it won its way into the Premier League.

In 1998 and 1999 financial pressures were building up behind the scenes; this led to a crisis in 2000 when the Club management was forced to call in an administrator. At the end of 2000, local business people Rocco and Fiona Varacalli stepped in and purchased the Elizabeth City assets, settled the debts, and re-launched the club as Playford City.

Playford won the Federation Cup in 2001 but was relegated to the State League in 2003. The club immediately won both the league and the finals series in 2004 and rejoined the Premier League.

Most recently, Playford beat Salisbury United 1–2 in order to claim a spot in the final of the 2014 play-off series against Modbury Jets. Which they went on to lose during extra time.

Players
First team squad

Club honours
 Federation Cup Winners: 2001
 2nd Division Champions: 1970, 1974, 1991 & 2004
 State League Final Series Winners: 1997 & 2004
 State League Finals Series Runners Up: 2014

References

External links
 Official Website
 FFSA Junior Football

Soccer clubs in Adelaide
Association football clubs established in 1956
1956 establishments in Australia